The Frances Tressady Stakes is a Victoria Racing Club Group 3 Thoroughbred horse race held under set weight conditions with penalties, for fillies and mares aged three years old 
and older, over a distance of 1400 metres, held annually at Flemington Racecourse in Melbourne, Australia in March.  Total Prize money is A$200,000.

History
The race has had several changes in grade, name and in distance. The race is named after the brilliant filly Frances Tressady who in 1923 won the VRC Victoria Derby – VRC Victorian Oaks double as well as finishing fifth in the Melbourne Cup.

Name
 1975–1994 - Frances Tressady Stakes
 1995–1999 - Devon Park Stud Stakes
 2000 - Chairman's Club Stakes
 2001 - Drumstick Gold Plate
 2002–2004 - Tooheys New Plate
 2005 - Schweppes Stakes
 2006–2010 - Schweppervescence Trophy
 2011–2012 - PFD Food Services Stakes
 2013 onwards - Frances Tressady Stakes

Grade
 1975–1979 - Listed race
 1980–2009 -  Group 3 race
 2010 - Listed race
 2011 onwards - Group 3 race

Distance
 1975–1979 – 1400 metres
 1980–1981 – 1600 metres
 1982 – 1400 metres
 1983–1985 – 1600 metres
 1986 onwards - 1400 metres

Winners

 2023 - Annavisto
 2022 - Annavisto
 2021 - Chaillot
 2020 - Sylvia's Mother
 2019 - Oregon’s Day
 2018 - Flippant
 2017 - Turbo Miss
 2016 - Wawail
 2015 - Madam Gangster
 2014 - Five All
 2013 - Tavarnelle
 2012 - Raspberries
 2011 - Aloha
 2010 - Captain Coltish
 2009 - Typhoon Tracy
 2008 - Coniston Gem
 2007 - Laura's Charm
 2006 - Breezy
 2005 - Skewif
 2004 - Demographic
 2003 - Galapagos Girl
 2002 - Shelbourne Lass
 2001 - Ticket To Rome
 2000 - Northern Song
 1999 - Fuss
 1998 - Blue Storm
 1997 - New Smyrna
 1996 - New Smyrna
 1995 - Tolanda
 1994 - Not Related
 1993 - Tarare
 1992 - Aushla Marie
 1991 - O'Deputy
 1990 - Thelma Josephine
 1989 - Riva Gleam
 1988 - Aussie Consul
 1987 - Playful Princess
 1986 - Deedle
 1985 - Sweet Gem
 1984 - Kalimna Queen
 1983 - Lemon Princess
 1982 - Winter Flower  
 1981 - Parisian Romp  
 1980 - Palace Gossip  
 1979 - Minuetto  
 1978 - Pushy  
 1977 - Brett's Honour 
 1976 - Hartshill  
 1975 - Half A Moment

See also
 Group races
 List of Australian Group races

References

Horse races in Australia
Flemington Racecourse
Sprint category horse races for fillies and mares
Recurring sporting events established in 1975
1975 establishments in Australia